The 1921 Louisiana Tech football team was an American football team that represented the Louisiana Polytechnic Institute—now known as Louisiana Tech University—as a member of the Louisiana Intercollegiate Athletic Association (LIAA) during the 1921 college football season. Led by R. Foster Clark in his second and final year as head coach, Louisiana Tech compiled an overall record of 6–0. Roe Hollis was the team's captain.

Schedule

References

Louisiana Tech
Louisiana Tech Bulldogs football seasons
Louisiana Tech football